In surface mining, stripping ratio or strip ratio refers to the amount of waste (or overburden) that must be removed to release a given ore quantity.
It is a number or ratio that express how much waste is mined per unit of ore. The units of a stripping ratio can vary between mine types. For example, in coal mining the stripping ratio is commonly referred to as volume/weight.
Whereas in metal mining, stripping ratio is unitless and is expressed as weight/weight. A stripping ratio can be expressed as a ratio or as a number.

Equations 
The equations for stripping ratio are,

for coal:

for metal:

where volume is typically expressed as m3 or yd and weight is typically expressed as tonne or ton.

Use 
It is common for the stripping ratio to be used as an indicator of economic value for an open pit mine. This is because removal of waste is a cost to the mine whereas mining ore leads to revenue. A stripping ratio is commonly used as a quick method to evaluate a mine’s or a design’s value. High stripping ratios are not desired because they are indicating that large amounts of waste must be moved to access  ore.

See also
 Open-pit mining

References

Surface mining